The Hornpipe Heights are a group of partly exposed ridges rising to about  lying between Sullivan Glacier, Mikado Glacier, and Clarsach Glacier in the northern part of Alexander Island, Antarctica. Whistle Pass is adjacent to the northeastern part of the heights. The heights were so named by the UK Antarctic Place-Names Committee in 1977 in association with Whistle Pass.

See also
 Care Heights
 Herschel Heights
 Sutton Heights

References

Ridges of Alexander Island